A championship or title in professional wrestling is a recognition promoted by professional wrestling organizations. Championship reigns are determined by professional wrestling matches, in which competitors are involved in predetermined rivalries. These narratives create feuds between the various competitors, which cast them as villains and heroes. The bookers in a company will place the title on the most accomplished performer, or whom they believe will generate fan interest in terms of event attendance and television viewership.

History 

Professional wrestling portrays the structure of title match combat sports. Participants compete for a championship, and must defend it after winning it. These titles are represented physically by a championship belt that is worn or carried by the champion(s). In the case of team wrestling, there is a belt for each member of the team.

Almost all professional wrestling promotions have one major title, and some have more. Championships are designated by divisions of weight, height, gender, wrestling style, and other qualifications.

Typically, each promotion only recognizes the "legitimacy" of their own titles, although cross-promotion does happen. When one promotion absorbs or purchases another, the titles from the defunct promotion may continue to be defended in the new promotion or be decommissioned, usually through championship unification.

Behind the scenes, the bookers in a company will place the title on the most accomplished performer, or those the bookers believe will generate fan interest in terms of event attendance and television viewership. Lower ranked titles may also be used on the performers who show potential, thus allowing them greater exposure to the audience. However, other circumstances may also determine the use of a championship. A combination of a championship's lineage, the caliber of performers as champion, and the frequency and manner of title changes, dictates the audience's perception of the title's quality, significance, and reputation.

A wrestler's championship accomplishments can be central to their career, becoming a measure of their performance ability and drawing power. The most accomplished or decorated wrestlers tend to be revered as legends. American wrestler Ric Flair has had multiple world heavyweight championship reigns spanning over three decades. Japanese wrestler Último Dragón once held and defended a record 10 titles simultaneously.

Championship belt styles 

Professional wrestling's championship belts are modeled similarly to the championship belts in boxing, and other combat sports such as mixed martial arts. They are made of elaborately designed plates of gold or other precious metals, usually bearing the name of the title and the wrestling promotion, and is on a leather strap. The color and designs vary with each title and promotion.

A wrestler may win a sanctioned championship and redesign the belt itself. Some (such as John Cena's Spinner Belt) later became the official belt design. Others (such as Stone Cold Steve Austin's Smoking Skull Belt, Edge's Rated-R Spinner, Daniel Bryan's eco-friendly belt, and The Fiend Bray Wyatt's Universal title with his face on it) were not used after their respective title reign.

While rare, there are cases of championships being represented with items other than belts, such as championship trophies, medals, crowns, etc. An example of this is WWE's NXT UK Heritage Cup Championship, which is represented with a trophy.

Injured champions 
The fate of a title depends on the champion's condition and the importance of the title to the promotion (e.g. Gregory Helms held the WWE Cruiserweight Championship, despite being sidelined with an injury, because the Cruiserweight Championship was not a major championship). The champion may be forced to vacate his or her title if the injury becomes too severe and the championship is too important. In May 2015, Daniel Bryan vacated the WWE Intercontinental Championship due to a major concussion and a year before, he had to vacate the world title due to neck surgery. In November 2015, Seth Rollins vacated the WWE World Heavyweight Championship due to a knee injury that required surgery.

However, a champion may keep their title despite a severe injury and despite the championship being quite important. In 1998, Shane Douglas kept the ECW World Heavyweight Championship while sidelined. In 2005, Trish Stratus kept the WWE Women's Championship while sidelined with a herniated disk for four months. In 2012, CM Punk kept the WWE Championship while undergoing and recovering from knee surgery. In 2015, Ryback kept the WWE Intercontinental Championship while recovering from a knee infection.

Before the 1980s when title matches were rare, some champions could keep their titles even when injured; Bruno Sammartino kept his WWWF World Heavyweight Championship from April to June 1976 despite being injured by a botched body slam from Stan Hansen. In Mexico, this situation still occurs, but in Japan, it is becoming increasingly rare as champions are needed to be present in regular tours even when titles are not defended.

Classifications 
Professional wrestling championships are often split up into various different classifications, each of which designate varying levels of importance to the belts.

World championships 

The world heavyweight championship (also just world championship) is the name given to the championship that is typically presented as being the most prestigious of those contested within a promotion. The wrestler holding a championship with this name is most commonly referred to as the "world heavyweight champion" or "world champion" (though some promotions may use synonymous/alternate terms, such as the AAA Mega Championship of Lucha Libre AAA World Wide or the WWE Universal Championship, the premier title of WWE's SmackDown brand). 

Since professional wrestling is scripted, there is no promotion or group of people that recognize one official world title of the industry (the closest was the NWA Worlds Heavyweight Championship during the territory days during the mid to late 20th century). 

Instead, each promotion can promote their top title as a world title, with some of them promoting title matches around the world to claim the designation. Some promotions may even recognize multiple world championships, such as is the case with WWE, as due to the large size of its roster, the promotion splits its roster into what they call brands where talent exclusively perform and their two main brands (Raw and SmackDown) each have their own world championship.

The first widely recognized world heavyweight championship was the World Heavyweight Wrestling Championship, created in 1905, and the inaugural champion was George Hackenschmidt. The lineage of many prominent contemporary world championships can be traced back to the World Heavyweight Wrestling Championship, with the NWA Worlds Heavyweight Championship considered its direct successor, with many world championships having been spun of from the NWA's title.

Location-specific championships 

A very common championship variation. The championship usually specifies the location on where the promotion is based, an example being WWE's United States Championship. Sometimes it may specify a specific state or territory, such as the NWA Georgia Heavyweight Championship. It is also common to be a smaller division of the world, an example being the WWE Intercontinental Championship, the AEW International Championship (previously known as the All-Atlantic Championship), or the IWGP United States Heavyweight Championship. It is very common for these variations to be the second most prestigious championship in a promotion, but exceptions have existed, like the now defunct WWE European Championship, which served as the company's tertiary singles championship, and the NWA United States Heavyweight Championship, which many NWA territories created versions of and promoted as their most prestigious championship whenever the NWA World Heavyweight Champion was not around.

Weight class championships 

Another common classification of championships are by weight classes. Given the scripted nature of professional wrestling matches, weight classes are not always strictly adhered to. Typically, promotions prefer to have a heavyweight title as their top prize, with other designations, such as cruiserweight, middleweight, or light-heavyweight titles. Promotions often have one sub-heavyweight classification, while others sometimes may have more. Mountevans' committee (a governing body that instilled rules for professional wrestling in the UK) created seven formal weight divisions:

 Lightweight
 Welterweight
 Middleweight
 Heavy middleweight
 Light heavyweight
 Mid-heavyweight
 Heavyweight (above )

Classifying championships into weight classes is also common practice in the lucha libre promotions of Mexico.  Lucha libre has a detailed weight class system patterned after boxing. Each weight class has an official upper limit, but examples of wrestlers who are technically too heavy to hold their title can be found. The following weight classes exist in lucha libre, as defined by the "Comisión de Box y Lucha Libre Mexico D.F." (the Mexico City Boxing and Wrestling Commission), the main regulatory body in Mexico:

 Flyweight
 Bantamweight
 Featherweight
 Lightweight
 Super Lightweight
 Welterweight
 Super Welterweight
 Middleweight
 Super Middleweight/Junior Light Heavyweight
 Light Heavyweight
 Junior Heavyweight/Cruiserweight
 Heavyweight (Minimum)

Gender championships 

Gender occasionally plays a role in the classifications of championship belts. Due to professional wrestling being a male dominated sport, only women's titles are given official gender classifications.  Generally, only men are allowed to win the championships without a gender specification, though Chyna defeating Jeff Jarrett to win the WWF Intercontinental Championship in 1999 and Tessa Blanchard defeating Sami Callihan to win the Impact World Championship in 2020 are notable exceptions. In promotions featuring only a single gender (such as Women of Wrestling or Shimmer Women Athletes), gender classifications are often unnecessary as well. Titles specifically designated for women may fall into any of the other categories listed here (e.g. women's world titles or women's tag team titles).

Andy Kaufman once used gender classifications to his advantage, turning inter-gender competitions into a unique wrestling side-show.  Kaufman declared himself the "Inter-Gender Champion of the World", and offered $1,000 to any woman who could pin him. None were successful during the run of the gimmick; though in other promotions such as WCW and WWE, women have successfully pinned men, most notably in a few isolated championship matches.

On rare occasions, a male wrestler will compete in championship matches for championships generally contested exclusively in the women's division.  Such examples include Harvey Wippleman becoming the only male to capture the WWF Women's Championship in 2000, and Eric Young winning one half of the TNA Knockouts Tag Team Championship in 2012.

Gimmick/style championships 

Gimmick match classifications sometimes factor into the creation of title belts. In these classifications, special skills in a certain type of match or a certain style of wrestling is the signature of the division, and the champion is considered to be the most skilled wrestler at that specific style.

Gimmick championships often take very differing forms. A common variation is the "hardcore championship", a title often defended in weapons-filled and bloody competitions with fewer rules (count outs and disqualifications are not usually allowed). An example of a hardcore championship is the WWE Hardcore Championship, which was active from 1998 to 2002. In 2019, the WWE introduced the WWE 24/7 Championship, which can be defended anytime, anywhere, as long as a WWE referee is present (it is also open to anyone, regardless of gender or WWE employment status). This championship is used more in comedy segments than normal matches. The hardcore championship was defended under nearly identical rules for most of its existence.

In recent years, style-based championships have centered around what is known as "scientific" or technical wrestling.  Examples of this include the NXT UK Heritage Cup (which was specifically contested under "British Round Rules") in WWE's NXT UK brand, and the ROH Pure Championship in Ring of Honor (which is contested under "Pure Wrestling Rules").

A variation that was prominent in the 1980s and 1990s and is somewhat making a return in the 2020s is a "television championship" or "iron man championship", which involves more frequent title defenses as well as the stipulations that the belt can only change hands on television (as opposed to non-televised house shows) with title matches having a short, TV-friendly time limit, usually 10 or 15 minutes. These titles were originally introduced during a time when weekly TV shows were seen as a vehicle to promote the money-making live shows, where major title defenses took place. Television titles provided a championship that would be defended on the weekly television shows. Examples of a television championship include the AEW TNT Championship - named after the home network of AEW's Rampage broadcast plus other AEW programming, and the ROH World Television Championship.  Past TV titles include the WCW World Television Championship, the ECW World Television Championship,  and the TNA Television Championship.

A modern take on the traditional TV title is the Impact Digital Media Championship, which was created in 2021 and defended primarily on Impact Wrestling's online platforms.

In 2021, AEW introduced the first TV title specifically for female wrestlers, the AEW TBS Championship, named for the network that is the home of Dynamite as of January 5, 2022, serving as the counterpart to the male TNT Championship.

Tag team championships 

Tag team championships are yet another different form of wrestling title. Some consider it to be a style championship, but tag team championships are unique in their ability to include multiple wrestlers on teams competing for multiple belts. The most common form of tag team championships are in 2-on-2 format, which is often implicitly understood. Other tag team championships include 3-on-3 and 4-on-4 formats, which are often explicitly stated within the championship name to distinguish them from the 2-on-2 championships. Some teams may invoke what is called the Freebird Rule, in which a stable of three or more wrestlers are all officially recognized as champion, allowing any pairing of the stable's members to defend the championship. This rule is most commonly applied to the standard 2-on-2 tag team championship, though it has also been applied to the other variants.

Tag team championships are also often combined with regional modifiers, gimmick modifiers, gender modifiers, and weight class modifiers to further distinguish them. In such cases, the primary title is usually called the world tag team championship, with the other championships seen as secondary titles. 

Examples of 2-on-2 tag team championships:
WWE Raw Tag Team Championship
WWE Women's Tag Team Championship
AEW World Tag Team Championship
Impact World Tag Team Championship
AAA World Tag Team Championship

Examples of 3-on-3 tag team championships:
AEW World Trios Championship
ROH World Six-Man Tag Team Championship
CMLL World Trios Championship
NEVER Openweight 6-Man Tag Team Championship
AAA World Trios Championship
NWA/WCW World Six-Man Tag Team Championship

Examples of 4-on-4 tag team championships:
FMW World Street Fight 8-Man Tag Team Championship

Examples of 5-on-5 tag team championships:
KO-D 10-Man Tag Team Championship

Unsanctioned championships 

The concept of championships, and their central role in wrestling, allows for the potential for angles. One such angle is an unsanctioned championship title. These are claimed by a wrestler and defended in sanctioned matches, but are not recognized as legitimate titles by the promotion.

Examples of unsanctioned championships include:
 Taz's FTW World Championship in ECW and AEW
 James Storm's TNA World Beer Drinking Championship in TNA
 Zack Ryder's WWE Internet Championship in WWE

See also 
 Championship unification
 Undisputed championship
 World tag team championship

References

External links 
 Pro-Wrestling Title Histories

 
Professional wrestling slang